There have been many railway stations in Newport, due to its importance as a port for the industrial Monmouthshire and Glamorganshire valleys. The only stations in use at the moment are Newport in the city centre and in the Western valley Pye Corner and Rogerstone.

History 
19 June 1850  was opened by the South Wales Railway.
21/23 December 1850 A temporary terminus station was opened at Courtybella on the Monmouthshire Railway and Canal Company's Western Valley line.
4 August 1852  was opened by the Monmouthshire Railway on its Western Valley line.
9 March 1853  opened to replace the Barrack Hill terminus.
May 1855 the Eastern Valley line was connected to the Western Valley line at Dock Street.
1 August 1863 Amalgamation of the South Wales Railway and the Great Western Railway amalgamated.
17 September 1874 Pontypool, Caerleon and Newport Railway opened from Pontypool South Junction to Maindee Junctions for goods trains.
21 December 1874 Passenger trains on the Pontypool, Caerleon and Newport Railway run to High Street station.
April 1878 Connection made from Llantarnam Junction on the Pontypool, Caerleon and Newport Railway to Cwmbran Junction on Eastern Valley line. Eastern Valley trains divert, via Caerleon, to Newport High Street.
1 January 1879 Park Junction to Gaer Junction opened allowing the Western Valley line access to use High Street station.
1 August 1880 Monmouthshire Railway and Canal Company and Great Western Railway amalgamated. Mill Street and Dock Street passenger stations closed.
28 November 1966 Newport Mill Street yard closed.

Former suburban stations 
The following list of stations are all within the present city boundary, although all have subsequently closed:

 (1850-1962)
 (1865-1962)
 (1874-1962)
 (1850-1960)
Marshes Turnpike Gate (1852-1853)
 (1850-1959)
Newport Courtybella (1850-1852)
Newport Mill Street (1853-1880)
Newport Dock Street (1852-1880)
 (1865-1954)

The future 
There are plans to operate services to Newport station on the newly reopened Ebbw Valley Railway and re-open more former stations on the line as part of a wider transport strategy for the city.

The Newport Unitary Development Plan lists the following policies in part 4 under "Public Transport":

Railways
T1 The railway system will be safeguarded and developed by:
<li>The provision of new stations at Caerleon, Coedkernew (Newport West), Rogerstone, Bassaleg (Pye Corner), Maesglas (Newport West Central) and Llanwern;
<li> the protection of disused railway lines from development;
<li> Protecting and encouraging rail access to industrial development;
<li> Promoting the re-opening of the Western Valley line to passenger traffic;
<li> Supporting improved rail links to Newport Docks and river wharves;
<li> Promoting the upgrading of the South Wales Main Line and through services to the continent;
<li> Supporting applications for government grant for new rail facilities.

References

Notes

Sources

External links 
Newport UDP

 
History of Newport, Wales